The Cyclo-cross Superprestige 2019-20 – also known as the Telenet Superprestige for sponsorship reasons – is a season-long cyclo-cross competition held in Belgium and the Netherlands.

Calendar

Men's competition

Women's competition

References

Notes

Cyclo-cross Superprestige
Superprestige
Superprestige